Maximiliano Moreira Romero (born 11 June 1994) is an Uruguayan professional footballer who plays as a left-back for Austria Klagenfurt.

Career
Moreira began his career with Nacional in 2013 in the Uruguayan Primera División, and shortly after joined Rentistas on loan. Hee joined Juventud on loan in 2014, and Atenas in 2015. He transferred to Uruguayan Segunda División side Huracán in 2017, followed by a return to Rentistas in 2018. He moved to Austria with Austria Klagenfurt in the summer of 2018. He helped Austria Klagenfurt get promoted into the Austrian Football Bundesliga for the 2021-22 season, and on 10 August 2021 extended his contract with the club until 2023.

International career
Moreira is a youth international for Uruguay, having represented the Uruguay U17s at the 2011 FIFA U-17 World Cup.

References

External links
 
 OEFB Profile

1994 births
Living people
People from Maldonado, Uruguay
Uruguayan footballers
Uruguay youth international footballers
SK Austria Klagenfurt players
C.A. Rentistas players
Club Atlético Huracán footballers
Atenas de San Carlos players
Juventud de Las Piedras players
Club Nacional de Football players
Austrian Football Bundesliga players
2. Liga (Austria) players
Uruguayan Primera División players
Uruguayan Segunda División players
Association football fullbacks
Uruguayan expatriate footballers
Uruguayan expatriates in Austria
Expatriate footballers in Austria